Fredberg is the name of an old noble family from Himmerland in Denmark. The earliest known ancestor is one Jens Jensen Fredberg who received his patent of nobility from Christian I of Denmark in 1450.

Nobility 
The noble family Fredberg whose descendants have long been living in the areas surrounding Himmerland, can be traced back to the noble man Jens Jensen Fredberg. In 1450 Jens Jensen Fredberg received his title of nobility from Christian I of Denmark and his estate was later inherited by his descendants. The family married into other prominent noble families such as Pors, Krag, Vinter, Munk and Griis.

The house of Fredberg still exists to this very day, but the family lost their title of nobility a few generations ago. The family has over time acquired vast areas of land and numerous manors, many of whom are still in the family's possession.

The family has long been one of Denmark's most prominent merchant families and are well-known manufacturers with business interests all over the world.

Sources 

Danish nobility